I'll Never Heil Again is a 1941 short subject directed by Jules White starring American slapstick comedy team The Three Stooges (Moe Howard, Larry Fine and Curly Howard). It is the 56th entry in the series released by Columbia Pictures starring the comedians, who released 190 shorts for the studio between 1934 and 1959.

Plot
A teaser proclaims: “All the characters in this picture are fictitious. Anyone resembling them is better off dead.” At the estate of King Herman the 6⅞ (Don Brodie) (a parody of Kaiser Wilhelm II), the deposed king of Moronica, war profiteers Ixnay (Vernon Dent), Amscray (Lynton Brent) and Umpchay (previously Onay, Bud Jamison) have decided that they have had enough of Moe Hailstone, the fascist dictator they put in power, and want to help Herman retake the throne. To this end, his daughter, the princess Gilda (Mary Ainslee, previously played by Lorna Gray under the Mattie Herring pseudonym), threatens to try and assassinate Hailstone using an explosive Number 13 pool ball strategically positioned in Hailstone's billiard table (the fictitious country of Moronica seems to be familiar with a pool game in which the 13 ball is placed at the head of the rack during set up).

Dictator Moe Hailstone of Moronica enjoys a shave, and fights Field Marshal Herring (previously Gallstone) (Curly) and the Minister of Propaganda (previously called Pebble) (Larry) for a turkey (a parody of Hitler possibly wanting control in Turkey). Larry parodies the attempts to control Greece by saying, "I'll wipe out grease". The winner of that battle is a portrait of Napoleon who grabs the bird from the bewildered Stooges, before running out of his frame (to enjoy his victory dinner). At a loss, Hailstone starts crying.

Gilda enters, and shows the Stooges a glimpse through a telescope of all three of them on a spit roasting in Hell and starts to place in Hailstone's mind the idea that his allies, the "Axel" partners, are plotting against him. After doing this, she replaces the 13 ball on Hailstone's pool table with the explosive 13 ball and flees as Hailstone begins a pool game with his partners. Throughout the rest of the game, the cue ball inexplicably defies the laws of physics, thereby avoiding the explosive ball by swerving around it and finally jumping over it, bouncing off the bumper of the pool table and colliding with Herring's head, shattering the cue ball into dust.

Later, the Axel partners arrive for a meeting. The partners consist of Chiselini (Cy Schindell; a parody of Il Duce Benito Mussolini), the Bey of Rum (Jack "Tiny" Lipson); an unnamed Japanese delegate (Nick Arno; a parody of Japanese emperor ); and an unnamed Russian delegate (Charles Dorety). As the meeting breaks into chaos following Hailstone's declaration that the world belongs to him, the Stooges go into action on the other delegates and each other. Finally, with all the other Axel delegates defeated, Hailstone orders Herring to surrender the globe they had fought over. Herring, however, refuses to comply and furiously smashes the globe over Hailstone's head, sending him into a temper tantrum. Herring, finally having enough of Hailstone's patronizing antics, yells at Hailstone as he grabs the explosive Number 13 ball and throws it against the floor, blowing up the meeting room upon impact. Herman regains his throne and the trio's taxidermied heads are used as three mounted hunting trophies.

Production notes
I'll Never Heil Again was the first sequel in the Stooge film canon, following the earlier setting in Moronica of You Nazty Spy!. It begins with Moe Hailstone firmly ensconced as the Hitler-like dictator of Moronica. Curly Howard plays Field Marshal Herring (a parody of Hermann Göring), who has so many medals that he wears them on both the front and back of his coat. Larry plays the Minister of Propaganda (a combination parody of Joseph Goebbels and to some extent also Foreign Minister Joachim von Ribbentrop). Filming commenced on April 15–18, 1941.

The film title is a parody of song title "I'll Never Smile Again", written by Ruth Lowe. It was released by Tommy Dorsey and His Orchestra featuring vocals by Frank Sinatra with The Pied Pipers in 1940. The song reached No. 1 on Billboard for 12 weeks and was inducted into the Grammy Hall of Fame in 1982.

I'll Never Heil Again marks one of the few times the Stooges break the fourth wall. In one scene, Moe Hailstone is ranting in mock German and Larry is responding in an equally mock Southern accent and Curly says to the camera: "They're nuts." One memorable scene has Hailstone's mustache being ripped off and Hailstone rants: "Give me my personality!"

At one point, Moe says, "Hail, you say!" Adults at the time would have recognized it as a play on the then-popular expression "The hell you say," which of course would never have been permitted by the Production Code.

While filming, devoted family man Moe rushed from the set to his daughter's birthday party in full costume. This caused a few calls to the LAPD. Bystanders reported at what they perceived to be Hitler running red lights in Hollywood.

A colorized version of this film was released in 2007. It was part of the DVD collection entitled Hapless Half-Wits.

Historical notes

In the previous film on this subject, You Nazty Spy!, Hailstone is shown as a tool of arms makers. In this film, they are shown as regretting their support, reflecting the real-life fact that all groups attempting to use the Nazi movement for their own ends ended up being controlled by it.

King Herman the 6⅞ is a caricature of Kaiser Wilhelm II in his appearance and especially his hobby of chopping wood. I'll Never Heil Again was released 5 weeks and 2 days after the real Wilhelm II died in exile.

I'll Never Heil Again premiered in Argentina in February 1942 (along with the other South American countries), but it was banned during the governments of Juan Perón (1945–1955, 1973–1974) because Perón was a sympathizer of Fascist Italy.

References

External links 
 
 
 
 I'll Never Heil Again at threestooges.net

1941 films
Cultural depictions of Adolf Hitler
Cultural depictions of Benito Mussolini
Cultural depictions of Hermann Göring
Cultural depictions of Joseph Goebbels
Cultural depictions of Hirohito
American satirical films
American political satire films
The Three Stooges films
American black-and-white films
American World War II propaganda shorts
Films directed by Jules White
1941 comedy films
Films set in Europe
Columbia Pictures short films
American slapstick comedy films
1940s English-language films
1940s American films